Caitlin A. "Kitty" Carruthers (born May 30, 1961) is a former American pair skater. With her adoptive brother, Peter Carruthers, she won a 1984 Olympic Silver medal, a 1982 World Bronze medal, and had been a four-time (1981-1984) United States National champion.

Career 
The Carruthers siblings were coached by Ronald Ludington.

They finished off the podium at the U.S. Championships in January 1979 but their results improved the following season. After winning the International St. Gervais in late August 1979, the pair went on to take gold at the Nebelhorn Trophy and silver at the 1979 Norton Skate (the inaugural Skate America). They placed second at the 1980 U.S. Championships and were assigned to their first Winter Olympics, where they finished fifth.

The pair won their first U.S. national title in 1981 and stepped onto the World podium at the 1982 World Championships. In 1984, after winning their fourth national title, they were sent to their second Winter Olympics and won the silver medal.

Following the 1984 Winter Olympics, the Carruthers siblings starred with "Ice Capades" and "Stars on Ice" for twelve years. They appeared throughout the world in many productions and made for television specials during their twelve-year career as professionals. They were inducted into the Adoption Hall of Fame in 1996 and into the United States Figure Skating Hall of Fame in 1999.

Personal life 
On June 16, 1990, Kitty Carruthers married Brett Conrad in Houston, Texas. They have four children — BJ, Kyle, Kayla and Brooke. She coaches figure skaters in the Houston area and contributes to many different charitable organizations.

Competitive highlights
(with Peter Carruthers)

References

External links
 Pairs on Ice profile
 
 

1961 births
Living people
American female pair skaters
American adoptees
Figure skaters at the 1980 Winter Olympics
Figure skaters at the 1984 Winter Olympics
Olympic silver medalists for the United States in figure skating
Sportspeople from Middlesex County, Massachusetts
Sportspeople from Harris County, Texas
People from Burlington, Massachusetts
People from Katy, Texas
Olympic medalists in figure skating
World Figure Skating Championships medalists
Medalists at the 1984 Winter Olympics
21st-century American women
20th-century American women